NGC 424 is a spiral galaxy in the constellation of Sculptor. It was discovered on November 30, 1837 by John Herschel.

Gallery

References

External links
 

0424
Sculptor (constellation)
Spiral galaxies
Astronomical objects discovered in 1837
004274